Britt Leach (born July 18, 1938, in Gadsden, Alabama) is an American character actor.

Biography and acting career
Leach was born on July 18, 1938, in Gadsden, Alabama. He graduated from McCallie School, a boys college-preparatory school in Chattanooga, Tennessee, in 1956. He graduated from Birmingham Southern College, where he was active in college theater, in the mid-1960s. He attended Northwestern University and briefly worked in Army intelligence.

Leach's film and television career started in the early 1970s. His most memorable movie roles include boorish hick bartender Dan Oldum in Jackson County Jail, hard-nosed detective Sergeant Cook in Night Warning, cranky toy store manager Mr. Sims in  Silent Night, Deadly Night, trailer park resident Mr. Potter in The Last Starfighter, Anthony Michael Hall's plumber father in  Weird Science and redneck hunter Reg in The Great Outdoors.

During the fall of 1976, Leach was cast in the role of Mickey "Wig" Wiggins, an airplane mechanic, in the eleven-episode CBS adventure series Spencer's Pilots, starring Gene Evans, Christopher Stone and Todd Susman. Among the many television shows on which he has appeared are The Brady Bunch, The Partridge Family, Insight, Bonanza, Hawkins, Three's Company, Tales from the Crypt, and Newhart.  He is probably most recognized for his reoccurring role as Easy Jackson on The Waltons.

Leach left acting in the early 1990s. His final film role was an uncredited appearance in the 1991 film Father of the Bride, in which his character, a supermarket assistant manager, confronts Steve Martin's character for making a scene in the supermarket and has him imprisoned for it.

From 1992 to 1999, Leach was co-editor and publisher of Country Connections, an award-winning bi-monthly magazine which covered environmental and progressive social issues. He has also written poems.

In 2007, Leach did not renew his membership in the Academy of Motion Picture Arts and Sciences and wrote of his frustration with DVD screeners in a satirical piece on his website.

Leach resides in Sherman Oaks, California, with his wife, Catherine Roberts Leach.

Filmography

References

External links

1938 births
Living people
People from Gadsden, Alabama
American male film actors
American male television actors
20th-century American male actors
Male actors from Alabama